Adolf Samassa de Gesztőcz (13 April 1867, Zlaté Moravce – 31 January 1929) was a Hungarian politician, who served as Interior Minister for few days in 1919.

References
 Magyar Életrajzi Lexikon

1867 births
1929 deaths
People from Zlaté Moravce
Hungarian Interior Ministers